Juliet Cuthbert-Flynn (born 9 April 1964) is a Jamaican politician and retired track and field sprinter who competed in the 100 metres and 200 metres. As an athlete, Cuthbert-Flynn competed at four Olympic Games, winning two silver medals at the 1992 games held in Barcelona.

As a politician, she has been the Jamaica Labour Party's Candidate and Member of Parliament for the St. Andrew West Rural constituency, defeating the People's National Party candidate Hugh Buchanan in Jamaica's General Elections held February 25, 2016. She went on to defeat the People's National Party Krystal Tomlinson to win a second term as Member of Parliament for the St. Andrew West Rural constituency, in the September 3, 2020 General Election. She was appointed State Minister in the Ministry of Health and Wellness following her reelection, when Prime Minister Andrew Holness selected his new slate of Cabinet Ministers.

Education

Cuthbert attended Morant Bay High School and later Olney High School in Philadelphia and the University of Texas in Austin, Texas.

While at Texas, she won the Broderick Award, (later referred to as the Honda-Broderick Award and now the Honda Sports Award) as the nation's best female collegiate track and field competitor in 1986.

Career

Athletics 
Cuthbert competed for her native country of Jamaica in the 1992 Summer Olympics held in Barcelona, Spain, in both the 100 meter sprint and the 200 meter sprint, winning the silver medals in both competitions. After running a good second leg in the 4 x 100 meter sprint relay final, Cuthbert injured a muscle in her leg before she competed in the second chance and dropped out of the race. This was a disappointing finish to the Summer Olympic Games for her and the other women of the Jamaican relay team. In 1992, Cuthbert was voted as the Jamaican "Sportswoman of the Year". 

Four years later at the Atlanta Olympic Games of 1996, Cuthbert helped the Jamaican 4 x 100 meter sprint relay team along with Michelle Freeman, Nikole Mitchell, and Merlene Ottey finish in third place and win the bronze medal.

With the Jamaican sprint relay team, Cuthbert also won a gold medal (1991) and two silver medals (1995, 1997) at World Championships in Athletics (actually, track and field) .

Politics 
In 2014 Cuthbert-Flynn entered politics when the Jamaica Labour Party introduced Cuthbert-Flynn to the media at the Jamaica Labour Party's 71st anniversary celebration press conference and re-launch of the party’s website at its Belmont Road Headquarters in St. Andrew. It was later announced that she would become the party's standard-bearer in the St. Andrew West Rural constituency. She was appointed by then Opposition Leader Andrew Holness, as Junior Opposition Spokesperson for Health and Healthy Living. 

In the February 25, 2016 General Election, she went on to defeat the People's National Party's incumbent Paul Buchanan, becoming the first Olympian elected to Jamaica's Parliament. Throughout her time as a legislator, she has pushed for the legalisation of abortion in Jamaica  and has been a strong advocate for the women in the population. She was re-elected for a second term, to continue representing the St. Andrew West Rural constituency in the September 3, 2020 General Elections. Cuthbert-Flynn defeated the People's National Party Krystal Tomlinson, widening her victory margin from her 2016 election win. Cuthbert-Flynn was appointed State Minister in the Ministry of Health and Wellness on September 12, 2020,  to serve alongside Dr Christopher Tufton who is the portfolio Minister. As State Minister in the Ministry of Health and Wellness, Cuthbert-Flynn is primarily responsible for Maternal Health, HIV Prevention and the reduction of Drug Abuse.

International competitions

References

External links 
 
 
 
 

1964 births
Living people
People from Saint Thomas Parish, Jamaica
Jamaican female sprinters
Olympic athletes of Jamaica
Olympic silver medalists for Jamaica
Olympic bronze medalists for Jamaica
Athletes (track and field) at the 1984 Summer Olympics
Athletes (track and field) at the 1988 Summer Olympics
Athletes (track and field) at the 1992 Summer Olympics
Athletes (track and field) at the 1996 Summer Olympics
World Athletics Championships athletes for Jamaica
World Athletics Championships medalists
Medalists at the 1996 Summer Olympics
Medalists at the 1992 Summer Olympics
Olympic silver medalists in athletics (track and field)
Olympic bronze medalists in athletics (track and field)
Goodwill Games medalists in athletics
21st-century Jamaican women politicians
21st-century Jamaican politicians
World Athletics Indoor Championships medalists
World Athletics Championships winners
Competitors at the 1994 Goodwill Games
Central American and Caribbean Games medalists in athletics
Olympic female sprinters
Members of the House of Representatives of Jamaica
Members of the 13th Parliament of Jamaica
Members of the 14th Parliament of Jamaica
Women government ministers of Jamaica
Ministers of Health of Jamaica